Mathias Menegoz (born 1968) is a French writer of Hungarian origin.

Biography 
He is the son of director  and producer Margaret Ménégoz.

Mathias Menegoz holds a doctorate in neurobiochemistry from the University of Paris V before abandoning research and devoting himself to writing.

He was awarded the prix Interallié in 2014 for his first novel, Karpathia.

Works 
2014: Karpathia, Paris, P.O.L, 704 p. .
- Prix Interallié 2014.

References

External links 
 Mathias Menegoz on Babelio
 Mathias Menegoz reçoit le prix Interallié on Le Figaro (20 November 2014)
 Le premier roman de Mathias Menegoz distingué par le prix Interallié on Le Monde (20 November 2014)
 Mathias Menegoz - Karpathia on YouTube

21st-century French novelists
Prix Interallié winners
Prix Emmanuel Roblès recipients
1968 births
Living people